The Venezuelan flowerpiercer (Diglossa venezuelensis) is a species of bird in the family Thraupidae. It is endemic to Venezuela.

Its natural habitat is subtropical or tropical moist montane forests in the north of Venezuela. It is threatened by habitat loss. Protected areas where it is resident include the Cueva del Guácharo National Park.

References

Venezuelan flowerpiercer
Birds of the Venezuelan Coastal Range
Endemic birds of Venezuela
Venezuelan flowerpiercer
Taxonomy articles created by Polbot